
The Mukhavets or Mukhovets ( (Muchaviec), BGN/PCGN romanization: Mukhavyets;  (Muchovec)) is a river in western Belarus, a tributary to the Bug.

The river rises in Pruzhany, Belarus, where the Mukha river and the  canal converge, flows through south-western Belarus and merges with the Bug River in Brest.

The river is 113 km long.

The river is connected with the Dnieper river by the Dnieper–Bug Canal.

Cities 

 Pruzhany
 Kobryn
 Zhabinka
 Brest

Tributaries 

 Dakhlowka
 Zhabinka
 Trastsyanitsa
 Asipowka
 Ryta

External links 
  About the river in Brest

Books
(in Russian, English and Polish) Ye.N.Meshechko, A.A.Gorbatsky (2005) Belarusian Polesye: Tourist Transeuropean Water Mains, Minsk, Four Quarters

Rivers of Brest Region
Rivers of Belarus